Cyanopepla submacula is a moth of the subfamily Arctiinae. It was described by Francis Walker in 1854. It is found in Mexico, Guatemala, El Salvador, Costa Rica, Panama and Venezuela.

References

Cyanopepla
Moths described in 1854